Carl T. Fischer (1912–1954) was a Native American jazz pianist and composer. He worked with Frankie Laine, and composed Laine's 1945 hit song We'll Be Together Again, and You've Changed with lyrics by Bill Carey.

Background
Carl Theodore Fischer was born on April 9, 1912, in Los Angeles, California. Fischer's parents, of Cherokee descent, overcame poverty to provide him with music lessons.

Musical career
At the age of 32, Fischer joined a touring band and wrote some minor hits, which led to his work as an accompanist for Laine. With Laine's encouragement, Fischer wrote the musical, Tecumseh!, although it was never performed before Fischer's death.

Family
Fischer's daughters, Carol and Terry, formed The Murmaids, the group that had a hit recording of "Popsicles and Icicles" in 1964.

Death
Fischer died on March 27, 1954, in Sherman Oaks, California.

References

1912 births
1954 deaths
American jazz pianists
American male pianists
American people of Cherokee descent
20th-century American pianists
20th-century American male musicians
American male jazz musicians